Oliver "Bingbing" Donaire Colina (born May 7, 1982) is a Filipino football coac. He was the assistant coach of Philippines Football League (PFL) club ADT and the Philippines national U23 team.

Coaching career

Philippines U14
Colina has coached the Philippine national under-14 team leading the national youth side to a third-place finish at the 2012 Japan-East Asean Football Exchange Programme U-14 Youth Football Festival in Osaka.

Sacred Heart and Leylam
Colina has concurrently coached the secondary football team of the Sacred Heart School-Ateneo de Cebu (SHS-AdC) and Leylam F.C.. He had led the former to secondary titles of the CESAFI, Mandaue City Meet and the Central Visayas Regional Athletic Association and the latter to at least three Men's Open titles in the Aboitiz Cup. He has been head coach of Leylam since its formation in 2012.

With the endorsement from the Cebu Football Association, he took the Asian Football Confederation (AFC) ‘A’ Coaching Certificate Course which was handled by the Philippine Football Federation and was conducted in two phases in 2017 and 2018. Colina became the second football coach from Cebu to earn an AFC "A" license in 2019, with the first being Mari Aberasturi. With the coaching license, Colina became eligible to coach a Philippines Football League side.

Kaya-Iloilo
Colina was appointed by Philippines Football League (PFL) club, Kaya–Iloilo to guide the team in their 2020 AFC Cup stint. Colina temporarily left his coaching position from both SHS-AdC and Leylam after he was granted a leave of absence by both teams. Colina led Kaya to a 2–0 win in their AFC Cup tie with Myanmar club Shan United which was also Colina's first competitive match with Kaya.

Dynamic Herb Cebu
In 2021, Colina returned to Cebu and was appointed head coach of PFL club Dynamic Herb Cebu for their debut season.

Philippines U23 and ADT
After a season with Cebu, Colina was appointed as assistant coach for Philippines U23 and ADT, assisting Norman Fegidero at the 2021 Southeast Asian Games.

References

People from Mandaue
Filipino football head coaches
Living people
1982 births